Luana is a city in Clayton County, Iowa, United States. The population was 301 at the time of the 2020 census, up from 249 in 2000.

Luana is the site of a large cheese factory of Swiss Valley Farms, a cooperative owned by 625 dairy producers in four states. The facility was acquired by the company in 1967, and manufactures a variety of cheeses. It has undergone several rounds of expansion, beginning in 2010 and 2015.

Luana is located along U.S. Routes 18 and 52 in northern Clayton County.

History
Luana was surveyed in 1867 by W. S. Scott, and named in honor of his wife, Luana.

Geography
Luana is located at  (43.060764, -91.453390).

Demographics

2010 census
As of the census of 2010, there were 269 people, 114 households, and 68 families living in the city. The racial makeup of the city was 99.3% White and 0.7% from two or more races. Hispanic or Latino of any race were 5.6% of the population.

There were 114 households, of which 30.7% had children under the age of 18 living with them, 46.5% were married couples living together, 9.6% had a female householder with no husband present, 3.5% had a male householder with no wife present, and 40.4% were non-families. 33.3% of all households were made up of individuals, and 18.5% had someone living alone who was 65 years of age or older. The average household size was 2.36 and the average family size was 3.04.

The median age in the city was 37.7 years. 28.3% of residents were under the age of 18; 6.7% were between the ages of 18 and 24; 22.7% were from 25 to 44; 25.4% were from 45 to 64; and 17.1% were 65 years of age or older. The gender makeup of the city was 48.0% male and 52.0% female.

2000 census
As of the census of 2000, there were 249 people, 107 households, and 66 families living in the city. The racial makeup of the city was 99.60% White, and 0.40% from two or more races. Hispanic or Latino of any race were 5.22% of the population.

There were 107 households, out of which 29.0% had children under the age of 18 living with them, 48.6% were married couples living together, 10.3% had a female householder with no husband present, and 38.3% were non-families. 33.6% of all households were made up of individuals, and 12.1% had someone living alone who was 65 years of age or older. The average household size was 2.33 and the average family size was 2.91.

In the city, the population was spread out, with 22.9% under the age of 18, 8.0% from 18 to 24, 32.5% from 25 to 44, 18.1% from 45 to 64, and 18.5% who were 65 years of age or older. The median age was 39 years. For every 100 females, there were 104.1 males. For every 100 females age 18 and over, there were 106.5 males.

The median income for a household in the city was $29,583, and the median income for a family was $40,357. Males had a median income of $27,955 versus $19,688 for females. The per capita income for the city was $16,165. About 4.5% of families and 9.9% of the population were below the poverty line, including 6.4% of those under the age of eighteen and 5.7% of those 65 or over.

Education
It is within the MFL MarMac Community School District. The district formed on July 1, 1994, with the merger of the Mar-Mac and M-F-L districts.

References

Cities in Iowa
Cities in Clayton County, Iowa
1867 establishments in Iowa
Populated places established in 1867